is a tribute album of covers of the Mobile Suit Gundam II: Soldiers of Sorrow theme song , originally by Daisuke Inoue. I, Senshi was the first album released to commemorate Gundam's 30th anniversary.

Track listing

External links
Gundamusik discography

2009 compilation albums
Gundam